The women's 1500 metres T20 event at the 2020 Summer Paralympics in Tokyo took place on 3 September 2021.

Records
Prior to the competition, the existing records were as follows:

Results
The final took place on 3 September 2021, at 10:26:

References

Women's 1500 metres T20
2021 in women's athletics